Isobel Lilian Gloag (1865–1917) was an English painter, known for her oil and watercolour portraits, as well as posters and stained-glass designs.

Biography
Gloag was born in London, the daughter of Scottish parents from Perthshire. Her early studies were made at St. John's Wood Art School, and she later studied at the Slade School of Fine Art. Ill health compelled her to put aside plans for regular study, and she entered the studio of M.W. Ridley's for private instruction, following this with work at the South Kensington Museum. After still further study with Raphaël Collin in Paris, she returned to London and soon had her work accepted at the Royal Academy of Arts, where she exhibited a total of 19 works. She was an elected member of the Royal Institute of Oil Painters and the New Society of Painters in Water-Colours. Her earlier works were inspired by the Pre-Raphaelites, while later works were more modern, and her works have been cited as examples of post-Victorian Aestheticism. She made several designs for the stained-glass artist Mary Lowndes. Suffering from health problems throughout her life, she died in London on 5 January 1917, aged 51. Her work was posthumously featured in an exhibition at the Grafton Galleries, London.

References

Further reading

1865 births
1917 deaths
19th-century English painters
20th-century English painters
20th-century English women artists
19th-century English women artists
Alumni of St John's Wood Art School
Alumni of the Slade School of Fine Art
Artists from London
English people of Scottish descent
English watercolourists
English women painters
Pre-Raphaelite painters
Pre-Raphaelite stained glass artists
Female Pre-Raphaelite painters
Women watercolorists